E il Casanova di Fellini? is an Italian documentary directed by Gianfranco Angelucci and Liliane Betti released in 1975.

Plot 
Five famous actors present what Fellini's Casanova, which remains to be filmed, would be if they are chosen for the leading part.

Production 
This “film on the film”, which is in a way the reverse of a making of, was actually shot to make the producer wait, because the gestation of the film was difficult. Fellini made a commitment to Dino De Laurentiis to make a "Casanova", but reading Casanova's memoirs annoyingly annoyed him, because he found the character particularly full of himself and his boring story, and he couldn't seem to start. But Gianfranco Angelucci's film also served as a cast for Fellini's main movie.

Cast 

 Olimpia Carlisi
 Piero Chiara
 Alain Cuny
 Federico Fellini
 Vittorio Gassman
 Roberto Gervaso
 Tonino Guerra
 Luigi Latini De Marchi
 Marcello Mastroianni
 Alberto Sordi
 Ugo Tognazzi

References

External links 
 

1975 films
1970s Italian-language films
Films scored by Nino Rota
Films about Giacomo Casanova
Cultural depictions of Giacomo Casanova
Films produced by Dino De Laurentiis
Films set in Rome
Italian documentary films
Works about Federico Fellini
1970s Italian films